Latex foam may refer to:
 Foam latex, a lightweight form of latex created from liquid latex
 Foam rubber, rubber that has been manufactured with a foaming agent to create an air-filled matrix structure

See also
 Foam
 Latex